Synagrops japonicus is a species of fish within the family of Acropomatidae. It was described by Döderlein in 1883.

Distribution 
It can be found from Eastern Africa up to the islands of Hawaii. Most of them live at a depth of 100-800 m (330-2600 ft).

Description 
They have 10 dorsal spines, 9 dorsal soft rays, 2 anal spines, 7 anal soft rays, and 25 vertebrae. The body is elongated and compressed with large cycloid scales. The body is blackish-brown when young, though after maturing into adults, it becomes paler.

References 

japonicus
Fish described in 1883